Urban aquaculture (also spelled aquiculture) is the aquatic farming of organisms, including all types of fish, cuttlefish, mussel shrimp and aqua plants within the urban environment (rivers, ponds, lakes, canals). In essence, urban aquaculture is the practice of aquaculture in an urban, or urbanising, environment. Urban aquaculture systems can be associated with a multitude of different production locations, species used, environment, and production intensity. The use of urban aquaculture has increased over the last several years as societies continue to urbanise and demand for food in urban environments increases. Methods of production include recirculating systems; land-based culture systems; multifunctional wetlands; ponds, borrow pits and lakes; cages and culture-based fisheries. Most production in urban environments will include either extensive (productivity is based solely on natural runoff) or intensive (tanks and cages of monoculture production), compared to aquaculture in general which is normally semi-intensive.

History 
Urban aquaculture emerges from the end of World War II (which was brought on by consumer demand for more seafood), through the 1970s (when it shifted from a small-scale community practice to a commercial practice). Furthermore, it is described how urban aquaculture has continued to steadily increase around the world until now.

Going into expert detail on the history and inception of urban aquaculture throughout Europe and discussing early examples prototypes of urban aquaculture that could be found in “Roman villas, monasteries, castles, manors and millponds” in ancient Europe. It can be concluded that aquaculture during this time represented advancements in technology, ways to demonstrate social status, a means to avoid poor fish capture, and an increasing consumer demand for seafood. Furthermore, It is described that the pressures and events that eventually led to abandoning these various systems, which include several notable historical events such as the fall of the Roman Empire, and both the depopulation and economic regression that occurred during the medieval time period.

According to White et al. (2004), aquaculture is mostly practiced in Asia with over 70% of the production solely coming from China. This amount of production is 33% of the world's total fish production. While aquaculture is commonly practices on an industrial basis, the three most farmed fish are from small scale aquaculture. Furthermore, they describe how urban aquaculture has continued to steadily increase around the world until now. The legitimacy of their claims is backed by the fact that they are writing for a SeaWeb an Aquaculture Clearinghouse dedicated to researching and publishing content on aquaculture policy and practices.

Aquaculture or aqua farming dates back to 1000 BCE China where it is actively used even today. From there it started spreading to other parts of the world, such as Europe and Asia. Aquaculture continued developing, but it became noticeable only during the industrialisation era (Alimentarium.org, 2019). Aquaculture reached global scales in the last decade mostly due to increasing demand for shrimps and prawns by developed countries. Also, there is a need for other possibilities for fishermen due to the fear of reduction of the marine population from overfishing and climate changes.

Types of use 
Providing a thorough account of production methods currently used in Europe such as recirculation units, horizontally integrated marine aquaculture facilities and systems exploiting industrial byproducts.

Various types of urban aquaculture are currently in use throughout the globe - going into distinct types and their specific use, such as: land-based culture systems; multifunctional wetlands; ponds, borrow pits and lakes; cages and culture-based fisheries.

Recirculating Aquaculture Systems (RAS) are the water reuse systems used in many areas.

There are numerous ways of using urban aquaculture systems. There are farming systems such as water-based systems which mostly use cages and pens. Land-based systems make use of ponds, tanks and raceways. Recycling systems are usually high control enclosed systems, whereas irrigated farm systems are for livestock fish, agriculture and irrigation ponds(Fao.org, 2019). However, it can be said that water-based systems are the most often used systems.

Impacts

Advantages 
The potential opportunities include: underprivileged community members may be able to access more affordable food; local production of fish and aquatic plants may prevent food insecurity; livelihoods may improve; and there may be opportunities for high returns on investment. The vast amount of research that Bunting and Little have conducted on this subject gives great legitimacy to their overview of the costs and benefits of urban aquaculture.

The urban aquaculture is of great and undeniable importance, and has multiple benefits, such as securing food and maintaining the offered goods to meet the market's demand, as well as guaranteeing numerous job opportunities and stable income for many families (Bunting et al.). The most important thing urban aquaculture provides to the society and the environment is the fact that it reuses wastewater and by-products from agriculture (Bunting et al.). This offers a valid solution to the problem of limited access to resources and this is why the urban aquaculture should be more widespread and encouraged for all the benefits it brings to the society as a whole.

Another advantage is definitely for the economy. Aquaculture is a great alternative food source and fuel source. It can increase the number of possible jobs since it provides new products and more labor (Bunting and Little, 455). When talking about environmental benefits, aquaculture helps reduce pollution with the help of mollusks and seaweed. It gives a way for sustainable use of sea resources and helps conserve biodiversity. Finally, it reduces the overall environmental disturbance because there is a decreased need for the fishing of wild stock and it provides alternative farming options.

Disadvantages 
According to Bunting and Little the constraints of urban aquaculture include, production variations, denying access to underprivileged members of a community; urban sprawl; user competition; theft; resource contamination; environmental pollution; high capital costs; financial risks; susceptibility to disease; technical failures; and volatile market conditions. According to one of the authors assessment on urban aquaculture, the world's population residing in cities exceeded half of the total in 2007 and a lot of them getting by in poor economic status.

Bunting and Little (2003) recommends a system-based approach for aquaculture. In the annotated bibliography provided, it was also notable that soil fertility is quickly declining. In addition, by 2030 about ¾ of Latin American will be in cities. This makes it all the more important for urban means of food production. Twenty percent of the food produced by the world is from urban.

Those against aquaculture claim that this method does not help in reducing waste, but rather cause it. In this way, aquaculture becomes a threat to the coastal ecosystem. Many say that it actually contaminates water and threatens the health of those who use that water. Also, some fish food can be contaminated by pesticides and chemicals used to feed the fish. It is said that aquaculture generally has a negative impact on the environment since it has to destroy in order to build fish cages and tanks.

Implementation

New York City 
Schreibman and Zarnoch discuss the potential results of implementing urban aquaculture. To do so they use New York City, United States as a model site. They provide great detail on the process of moving “urban aquaculture from concept to practice…” in this specific location. Schreibman and Zarnoch (2009) states that the United States’ strict standard for food production is an open door for good food production from aquaculture. They discuss the potential impacts such systems might have on the environment and economy in metropolitan areas. According to the authors, the success of aquaculture is dependent on the financial support it receives.

Cape Town 
Aquaculture was implemented in Cape Town to produce more than two tons of fish annually. Some entrepreneurs like Alan Flemming, whose aim is to provide food to low income communities through an innovative urban aquaculture system, which already received global recognition. With the technology applied, the aquaculture farm supplied Cape Town's 39 top restaurants. Places like Cape Town tried to implement aquaculture and are now producing more than two tons of fish annually.

Brazil 
Successful implementation of aquaculture would mean it is a sustainable and functioning method of aquaculture use. Implementation requires careful and concise planning with emphasis on environment preservation, rather than destruction. In Brazil, the government has been promoting studies on zoning and demarcation of aquaculture parks, which could, if successfully carried out, make Brazil the largest producers of fish in net-cages in the world.

Systems 
As urban aquacultures are starting to become more wide spread, especially in coastal areas, it is only logical to observe and study the systems used in the production of the fish and all the other products. There are three systems that differ from one another in the intensity they are managed by. The systems are; extensive, semi-intensive, and intensive. The extensive aquaculture is mainly characterized by increased dependence on natural food in the process of producing the stock (Bunting et al.). The Semi-intensive production, on the other hand, is primarily based on the fertilizer applications; this is done in order to improve the natural food production and to maintaining the use of low-protein supplements (Bunting et al.). As for the intensively managed systems, however, they depend on externally sourced high protein input feed. Also, the by-products and waste resources are utilized and used to produce food of high protein value and level such as tubifex worms and fly larvae to supply aquaculture producers (Bunting et al.). This shows and highlights the different means of production of the urban aquaculture and how they are maintained and integrated in the process of farming the fish and the other products.

There are three general types of aquaculture systems based on the way they are managed. They include extensive, semi-intensive and intensive systems. Extensive aquaculture systems are usually conducted in medium-to-large-sized ponds or water bodies. The fish production depends on the natural productivity of the water, making this system low cost and maintenance. With semi-intensive fish farming, the production of fish per unit is low. However, they tend to be incomplete and are rarely used as a sole food source. Intensive fish farming involves that the quantity of fish produced per unit of rearing area is great. To intensify the culture, production factors have to be controlled to improve the production conditions.

See also 
 Aquaculture

References 

Aquaculture
Buildings and structures used to confine animals